is a natural satellite of Jupiter. It was discovered by a team of astronomers led by Brett J. Gladman in 2003.

It belongs to the Ananke group of retrograde irregular moons which orbit Jupiter between 19.3 and 22.7 Gm, at inclinations of roughly 150°.

This moon was once considered lost until September 2010, when it was recovered by Christian Veillet with Canada-France-Hawaii Telescope (CFHT). However, the recovery observations of S/2003 J 16 were not reported by the Minor Planet Center until 2020, when Ashton et al. independently identified the moon in the same CFHT images taken by Veillet back in September 2010. S/2003 J 16 was also identified in observations by Scott Sheppard from March 2017 to May 2018, cumulating a long observation arc of 5,574 days (15 years) since its discovery. The recovery of S/2003 J 16 was formally announced by the Minor Planet Center on 4 November 2020.

References

Ananke group
Moons of Jupiter
Irregular satellites
20030206
Discoveries by Brett J. Gladman
Discoveries by Jean-Marc Petit
Discoveries by John J. Kavelaars
Discoveries by Rhiannon Lynne Allen
Moons with a retrograde orbit